Arizona Stadium is an outdoor college football stadium in the southwestern United States, located on the campus of the University of Arizona in Tucson, Arizona. It is the home field of the Arizona Wildcats of the Pac-12 Conference.

Originally constructed in 1929 to hold 7,000 spectators, the stadium's seating capacity has been expanded numerous times since. As of 2022, the stadium has a total capacity of 50,800. The facility also includes the offices of the Wildcat football program, as well as some non-athletic academic offices, including the Steward Observatory Mirror Lab.

History
Located in central Tucson, Arizona Stadium has been home to University of Arizona Wildcats football since 1929. Initially, stadium capacity was 7,000, with the only seating located on the stadium's west side. The first game was a 35–0 shutout of Caltech on October 12. Capacity was increased to 10,000 in 1938 when seats were constructed on the stadium's east side. Four thousand seats were added to both end zones in 1947.

In 1950, a horseshoe configuration was constructed around the south end zone resulting in the addition of almost 8,700 seats. A multi-level press box and 10,000 seats were added to the west grandstand in 1965. The east side of the stadium received a second tier, consisting of 17,000 seats, in 1976, as the Wildcats prepared to leave the WAC for the Pac-8 in 1978.

The Copper Bowl (now the Cactus Bowl) was a postseason bowl game based in Tucson and held at Arizona Stadium for ten years before moving to Phoenix. It is now played in Tempe at Sun Devil Stadium, home of rival Arizona State.

Expansion and renovation
In 1981, the track team stopped using the stadium and the track was removed. Permanent seating was placed at the north end zone in 1988. Following the 1988 season, a new press box with luxury sky boxes was built. The sky boxes include a 319 loge seats on the first level, 23 luxury suites between the 2nd and 3rd levels, and a media level on the 4th floor.  Because the stadium was in place, the sky boxes are built so that the structure is cantilevered out over the western edge of the stadium seats, without actually touching the stadium. Prior to the 1999 season, a new scoreboard with a video monitor was installed.

In January 2011, it was announced that a new  video board would be installed above the south stands in time for the 2011 season. It is the seventh-largest video screen in college football (sixth-largest if non-college-exclusive stadiums are excluded, as Miami shares Hard Rock Stadium with the Miami Dolphins).

In September 2009, Arizona announced plans for the Lowell-Stevens Football Facility, a $72.3 million north end-zone project with seats and luxury boxes atop a four-story complex housing locker rooms, football offices, a weight training area, a cafeteria for student athletes, the upscale Sands Club, and new concessions and bathrooms.  The project broke ground after the conclusion of the 2011 season. Because the north bleachers were torn down and the project wouldn't be finished during the 2012 season, several rows of seats were added to the bottom of the south endzone in mid-2012.  On July 1, 2013, the project was completed and the team officially moved into the new facility. Because the football offices were formerly housed in the McKale Center, more space was made available for Wildcats basketball and other athletic programs.

In addition to the Lowell-Stevens Football Facility, the playing surface was changed from natural Bermuda grass to FieldTurf, an infilled synthetic turf. The new surface allows the team to practice on the field during the week when previously it was off limits while the grass recovered between games. Because of the extreme sun and temperatures in Tucson, the athletic department chose Revolution CoolPlay FieldTurf, designed to keep the surface temperatures cooler than with other artificial turf. It utilizes cork rather than crumb rubber as the top dressing. FieldTurf is used by more than half of the teams in the Pac-12 Conference and by many other schools around the nation.

Structure, facilities, and other uses
The ZonaZoo student section takes up 9,000 seats on lower east sideline, making it one of the larger student sections in the Pac-12. The west side bleachers are generally reserved for season ticket holders and the visiting team gets a section in the southwest corner.

The facility also includes two dormitories, Pinal and Navajo, under the south stands. The Steward Observatory Mirror Lab, a mirror fabrication facility for large telescopes, sits under the east wing. As mentioned above, there are also offices located in the Lowell-Stevens facility housing Football Operations.

In May 2013, the university held spring commencement ceremonies in the stadium for the first time since 1972 (they had been held in McKale Center after it opened in 1973).  A reported 25,000 friends and family were in attendance at the ceremony and following light show and fireworks display.

Arizona Bowl
Since December 2015, the stadium has hosted the Arizona Bowl. Since its inception, the game has matched the Mountain West and Sun Belt conferences. The inaugural game invited the Nevada Wolf Pack and the Colorado State Rams, both of the Mountain West, as the Sun Belt did not field enough bowl-eligible teams. This was the first time a bowl game featured teams from the same conference since the 1979 Orange Bowl, and Nevada won 28–23. Another notable game occurred in 2017, when the New Mexico State Aggies broke their 57-year bowl-less streak and defeated the Utah State Aggies in overtime.

Concerts
The stadium has been the site of several concerts, including Fleetwood Mac in 1977 and a Jay-Z concert with Kelly Clarkson in 2009.

In film
In 1983, the stadium's parking lot, located on the northeast end of the facility, was one of several filming locations for the 20th Century Fox comedy Revenge of the Nerds. The film's Adams College Greek Games sequence was shot in the space on Cherry Avenue between East 4th Street and East University Boulevard.

In the 1970 film C. C. & Company with Joe Namath and Ann-Margaret, the stadium track was used for the finale motorcycle race.

Gallery

See also
 List of NCAA Division I FBS football stadiums

References

External links

 

Arizona Wildcats football
College football venues
NCAA bowl game venues
American football venues in Arizona
Sports venues in Tucson, Arizona
Sports venues completed in 1928
1928 establishments in Arizona